Peter Bowler may refer to:

 Peter Bowler (lexicographer) (1934–2020), Australian lexicographer
 Peter J. Bowler (born 1944), historian of science
 Peter Bowler (cricketer) (born 1963), Australian cricketer who played for Derbyshire, Somerset and Leicestershire

See also  
 Bowler (disambiguation)